Count Fyodor Alexeyevich Golovin (1650 – ) was the last Russian boyar and the first Chancellor of the Russian Empire, he was also a field marshal, and general admiral (1700).

Biography 
Golovin was descended from the family of Russian treasurers of Byzantine Greek descent.

Military career 
During the regency of Sophia Alekseyevna, sister of Peter the Great, he was sent to the Amur to defend the new fortress of Albazin against the Chinese Qing Empire. In 1689, he ended with the Qing Empire the Treaty of Nerchinsk, by which the line of the Amur, as far as its tributary the Gorbitsa, was retroceded to China because of the impossibility of seriously defending it.

In Peter's Grand Embassy to the West in 1697 Golovin occupied the second place immediately after Franz Lefort. It was his chief duty to hire foreign sailors and obtain everything necessary for the construction and complete equipment of a fleet. On Lefort's death, in March 1699, he succeeded him as Field Marshal. The same year he was created as the first Russian count and was also the first to be decorated with the newly instituted Russian Order of St. Andrew.

Foreign affairs 
The conduct of foreign affairs was at the same time entrusted to him, and from 1699 to his death he was the premier minister of the Tsar. Golovin's first achievement as foreign minister was to supplement the Treaty of Karlowitz, by which peace with the Ottoman Empire had only been secured for three years, by concluding with the Porte a new treaty at Constantinople (June 13, 1700), by which the term of the peace was extended to thirty years and, besides other concessions, the Azov district and a strip of territory extending into Kuban and surrendering to Russia. He also controlled, with consummate ability, the operations of the brand new Russian diplomats at the various foreign courts.

It is of the opinion of historian R. N. Bain that he was superior to his Moscow contemporaries because of his previous knowledge of statesmanship, something his contemporaries lacked. Bain also claims his death was of great loss to the Tsar, who wrote the words upon his death: "Peter filled with grief".

References

Sources 
 
 Bushkovitch, Paul, A Concise History of Russia. New York: Cambridge University Press, 2012.

Foreign ministers of the Tsardom of Russia
Chancellors of the Russian Empire
Field marshals of Russia
Imperial Russian Navy admirals
Russian nobility
1650 births
1706 deaths
17th-century Russian military personnel
18th-century military personnel from the Russian Empire
Russian people of Greek descent